John Hassler Dietrich (1878–1957) was a Unitarian minister, born at Chambersburg, Pennsylvania, is called the "Father of  Religious Humanism".  He was educated at Franklin and Marshall College and at the Lancaster Theological Seminary in Lancaster, Pennsylvania, ordained in the ministry of the Reformed Church in 1905, and  defrocked in 1911 for failing to affirm primary Christian beliefs. His religious development evolved to Humanism and Unitarianism, in which he served various pastorates, including First Unitarian Society of Spokane (1911-1916), and then First Unitarian Society of Minneapolis (1916-1938). He retired to Berkeley, California, where he died. He is buried in the crypt of First Unitarian Church of Chicago. He was the author of:  
 The Gain for Religion in Modern Thought (1908)
 The Religion of a Sceptic (1911)
 Substitutes for the Old Beliefs (1914)
 From Stardust to Soul (1916)
 The Religion of Evolution (1917)
 The Religion of Humanity (1919)
 The Fathers of Evolution (1927)

See also

Religious humanism
Humanist Manifesto I
Unitarian Universalism

External links
John Hassler Dietrich UUA
John H. Dietrich:  Religion Without God?
HUUmanists
The Founding of the Humanist Church and the History of Religious Humanism
Dietrich's Sermons at First Unitarian Society of Minneapolis - Ongoing Archiving Project to Digitize all of Dietrich's Addresses
https://www.amazon.com/Douglas-Kenneth-Peary/e/B001K8Z9P2  Editor ongoing of All the Dietrich Sermons "The Life and Teachings of John Hassler Dietrich, The Father of Modern Humanism.

References

 

20th-century Christian clergy
American theologians
1957 deaths
1878 births
Franklin & Marshall College alumni
People from Chambersburg, Pennsylvania
Religious naturalists
American Unitarian clergy
American humanists
20th-century American clergy